Sofía Álvarez (born Sofía Calzadilla Bichara on April 29, 1958) is a Mexican actress and writer. She is known better for Contando con Sofía (1978), Sofiando (1984) and Ladies Night (2003).

Biography 
Álvarez was born on April 29, 1958, in Mexico. Her debut career started in 1963 at 5 years old, dubbing several films like The third secret. She also lent her voice to several television series. In 1978, she joined Canal 11 in Mexico, where she presented the program Cuenta con Sofía. In 1979 she played in the film Maria de mi corazón in which she met Héctor Bonilla and the director Jaime Humberto Hermosillo.

Animated by Héctor Bonilla, Sofia switched to the television Televisa, in which both shared credits in the telenovela Atrapada, at the end of this production in 1992, Bonilla is vetoed from the television station and next to Sofía are again integrated into the ranks of TvAzteca. In 1994, Sophia starred in the episode "Andamos brujas" of the series of television Entre vivos y muertos. In 2003 she appeared in the film Ladies night. In 2005 she appeared to the cast of the telenovela La otra mitad del sol.

In 2014 she appeared in the cast telenovela Amor sin reserva and in 2015 played in the film Refugio.

Filmography

Theatre

Cuenta con Sofía
Emociones encontradas
En retirada
Tríptico de guerra
Los monólogos de la vagina
Cabos sueltos
El extranjero
Magnolias de acero
Amor y crimen en la casa de Dios
Menoclownsia (2014-2015) - Menoclownsia

Discography
"Cuento de navidad" (1983)

References

External links 
 

1958 births
Living people
Mexican telenovela actresses
Mexican television actresses
Mexican film actresses
Mexican voice actresses
Mexican stage actresses
Mexican television producers
Women television producers
Mexican women writers
20th-century Mexican actresses
21st-century Mexican actresses